Luzonacera is a genus of spiders in the family Psilodercidae. It was erected by Feng-Yuan Li and Shu-Qiang Li in 2017. , it contains five species found on the Philippine island of Luzon.

References

Araneomorphae
Araneomorphae genera
Spiders of Asia